Joe Émerson Bizera Bastos (born 17 May 1980 in Artigas) is a Uruguayan former football player, who last played for Liverpool Montevideo. Bizera played for Cagliari in Italy. In January 2008, he made a loan move to Maccabi Tel Aviv F.C. until the end of the season. In the same year, he signed for PAOK FC.

International career
For the Uruguay national football team he was a participant at the 2002 FIFA World Cup.

References

External links
 Soccerway profile
 Player profile
 

1980 births
Living people
People from Artigas Department
Uruguayan footballers
Uruguayan expatriate footballers
Uruguay international footballers
Albacete Balompié players
Peñarol players
Cagliari Calcio players
Maccabi Tel Aviv F.C. players
PAOK FC players
Maccabi Petah Tikva F.C. players
C.A. Bella Vista players
Club Libertad footballers
Atlante F.C. footballers
Liverpool F.C. (Montevideo) players
2001 Copa América players
2002 FIFA World Cup players
2004 Copa América players
Uruguayan Primera División players
Serie A players
Super League Greece players
Israeli Premier League players
Liga MX players
Expatriate footballers in Paraguay
Expatriate footballers in Italy
Expatriate footballers in Greece
Expatriate footballers in Spain
Expatriate footballers in Israel
Expatriate footballers in Mexico

Association football defenders